The University of Ragusa is a university located in Ragusa and Ragusa Ibla Italy, and founded in 1998.This university depends on Catania University and It is the most recent university in Sicily.

Organization

Faculties
These are 2 faculties in which the university is divided into:

 Agricultural science
 Law
 Foreign languages
 Political science

History
The university was founded by the mayor Carmelo Arezzo (a lawyer himself) and the first faculty was that one of Law.
Lessons were held in Ragusa Ibla at the Presidio (Distretto Militare) and in Ragusa in the Episcopal see (Vescovado) auditorium.
Due to the Global economic crisis of 2008 and the European sovereign-debt crisis lessons started having serious problems to take place regularly.
Given the dire straits and gloomy times students, professor and assistants (when not busy in looking for means to meet daily economical needs) meet informally at the Cesare Zipelli library in Ragusa Ibla.

References

Universities in Italy
University of Ragusa
Education in Sicily

it:Cultura a Ragusa#Università